Giuseppe Levi (14 October 1872 – 3 February 1965) was an Italian anatomist and histologist, professor of human anatomy (since 1916) at the universities of Sassari, Palermo and Turin. He was born on 14 October 1872 in Trieste to Jewish parents, Michele Levi and Emma Perugia. He was married to Lidia Tanzi and had five children: Gino, Mario, Alberto, Paola (who became the wife of Adriano Olivetti), and writer Natalia Ginzburg (wife of Leone Ginzburg and mother of Carlo Ginzburg), who described her father's personality in the successful Italian book Lessico famigliare (1963).

Levi was a pioneer of in vitro studies of cultured cells. He contributed to the study of the nervous system, especially on the plasticity of sensory ganglion cells.

While in Turin, he tutored three students who later won the Nobel prize: Salvador Luria, Renato Dulbecco and Rita Levi-Montalcini.

He was admitted as a national member of the Accademia Nazionale dei Lincei in 1926. In 1931 he subscribed to the oath of allegiance to the Fascist regime imposed to University professors.

References

Bibliography

 Andrea Grignolio (ed.), Giuseppe Levi, «Medicina nei secoli» (Special issue: articles in Italian or in English), 2018, Vol. 30, n. 1, pp. 9-445

External sources 
 English translation via Google Translate

1872 births
1965 deaths
20th-century Italian Jews
Italian anatomists
Jewish physicians
Histologists
Levites
Foreign associates of the National Academy of Sciences
Physicians from Trieste